Behmer is a surname. Notable people with the surname include:

Anke Behmer (born 1961), German athlete
Ernst Behmer (1875–1938), German stage and film actor
Hermann Fenner-Behmer (1866–1913), German artist
Marcus Behmer (1879–1958), German writer and book illustrator, graphic designer and painter

German-language surnames